The Kuwait Hockey League is the national ice hockey league in Kuwait and the 68th member of the International Ice Hockey Federation. Four teams participated in the 2008-2009 season, and the top two teams met in the final, won by Kuwait.

2008-09 season

Regular season

Final
 Kuwait 4 - Qadsia 2

References

External links
Kuwait Ice Hockey Association
International Ice Hockey Federation - Kuwait
League on sfrp.cz

Ice hockey leagues in Asia
Ice hockey in Kuwait